Pit is a fast-paced card game for three to eight players, designed to simulate open outcry bidding for commodities. The game first went on sale in 1904 by the American games company Parker Brothers, having been developed by the clairvoyant Edgar Cayce.

The inspirations were the Chicago Board of Trade (known as 'The Pit') and the US Corn Exchange. The game itself was likely based on the very successful game Gavitt's Stock Exchange, invented in 1903 by Harry E. Gavitt of Topeka, Kansas.

While the name Pit remains trademarked in many countries by Hasbro, versions of the game have been marketed under names, including Billionaire, Business, Cambio, Deluxe Pit, Quick 7, Zaster.

Contents
Some decks consist of 74 cards with nine cards each of eight different commodities. The specific commodities have varied over the various editions of the game, but those used in most modern editions are Barley, Corn, Coffee, Oranges, Oats, Soybeans, Sugar and Wheat. The classic version has seven commodities: flax, hay, oats, rye, corn, barley, and wheat. Two special cards are also included, the Bull and the Bear; use of these cards is optional.

Versions of the game starting in the 1970s contained a bell used to start trading.  The first player to hold all nine cards of a commodity would ring the bell.

Play

The number of commodities included in each round is equal to the number of players. Each player is dealt nine cards; two players get ten if the Bull and Bear are included in play.

Pit has no turns and everyone plays at once. Players trade commodities among one another by each blindly exchanging one to four cards of the same type. The trading process involves calling out the number of cards one wishes to trade until another player holds out an equal number of commodity cards. The two parties then exchange the cards face down.

As soon as a player has nine cards of the same commodity, they must throw their cards onto the middle (the corner board if available) and call out "Corner on (the name of the commodity they are holding)!", ending the round. That player then earns points equal to the number value of the commodity they were holding. In deluxe editions of the game, the player with a full set of nine has to ring the bell instead of throwing their cards.

The first player to reach an agreed-upon point total wins the game.

The Bull and the Bear
The Bull card is considered wild and can be used to complete any set. When it is in play, a player can win a round in any of the following ways:

 Holding all nine cards of the same commodity, as described above, with or without a tenth card in the hand
 Holding eight cards of one commodity and the Bull ("Bull Corner")
 Holding all nine cards of the same commodity and the Bull ("Double Bull Corner"), which awards double value

The Bear card serves as a hazard for players, as its holder may not declare a Corner even while holding all cards of the same commodity.

At the end of a round, the Bull and Bear each impose a 20-point penalty on any non-winning player holding them. It is possible for a player's score to go below zero.

The Bull and Bear may be traded singly or together, either by themselves or with a group of cards in the same commodity. However, the four-card maximum for a single trade still applies.

Phrases often used during play
 
 Chasing the bear: When one attempts to follow the progress of the Bear after trading it away by watching the following trades.
 Corner on the cob: Winning a round with a full set of corn.
 Going for a hay ride: When one attempts to pick up all of a commodity that one has little of, because one has traded enough of it back and forth that one has an idea where it is all located.	
 Slip them the bear: When one trades away the Bear, usually just before the round is about to end.	
 The granary: A player's hand.	
 Getting flaxed: Inadvertently acquiring an abundance of flax, the commodity with the lowest value.
 Flaxing out: Winning a round with a full set of flax.
 Bear trap: Receipt of the Bear just preceding the ring of the bell to signify the game's end; doubly nasty if receipt of the Bear was part of the final trade that facilitated the winning hand.

Variations

The original edition contained only seven commodities, all of which were crops.

Newer versions include seven or eight commodities, replacing Flax, Hay and Rye with Oranges, Coffee, Sugar and Soybeans.

The 100th anniversary edition, released in 2004, included a reproduction of the original edition as well as a brand new edition that featured 8 "modernized" commodities.

Reviews
Games and Puzzles
1980 Games 100 in Games

References

Card games introduced in 1904
Dedicated deck card games
Parker Brothers games